Konsta Mäkinen (born January 19, 1992) is a Finnish professional ice hockey defenceman. He currently plays for SønderjyskE Ishockey of the Danish Metal Ligaen.

He made his Liiga debut playing with Ilves during the 2010–11 SM-liiga season.

References

External links

1992 births
Living people
Finnish ice hockey defencemen
Ilves players
Ice hockey people from Tampere